European BEST Engineering Competition (EBEC) is an annual engineering competition organised by the Board of European Students of Technology (BEST). EBEC spreads in 32 countries with the mission to develop students by offering them the opportunity to challenge themselves in solving a theoretical or a practical problem. Students form teams of four and are called upon to solve an interdisciplinary Team Design or Case Study task, thus addressing students from all the fields of engineering.

Bringing together students, universities, companies, institutions and NGOs, EBEC aims at taking out students’ full range of multidisciplinary knowledge and personal skills and applying this potential into solving real-life problems by working in teams.

EBEC is under the core service of BEST to provide complementary education. During the competition, active and inquisitive students have the chance to apply the knowledge gained through university, to challenge themselves, to broaden their horizons, to develop their creativity and communication skills. These being fundamental elements of the competition, EBEC contributes in the support and advancement of the technological education, as well as in the promotion of a collaboration in a multicultural environment.

In 2019, EBEC Final Round will be held in Turin.

History 

The idea of competitions was introduced in BEST through the Canadian Engineering Competitions (CEC) organized by Canadian Federation of Engineering Students (CFES). Members of BEST visited CEC in 2002 as guests and the idea of organising such competitions was discussed in that same year during BEST General Assembly. This is when the story of BEST Competitions begins, with the first BEST European Engineering Competition (BEEC) being organised in Eindhoven in 2003, the first National Round taking place in Portugal in 2006 and the very first EBEC Final being organised in Ghent in 2009 with finalists selected among 2300 participants from 51 universities in 18 countries, marking the completion of EBEC Pyramid.

Structure 

EBEC develops through three levels of competitions that form the EBEC Pyramid. With 84 Local Rounds, 15 National/Regional Rounds and 1 Final Round, EBEC is one of the largest engineering competitions organized by students for students in Europe, with nearly 7,000 students participating every year.

Local Rounds 
Local Rounds (LRs) are held within one University with an established Local BEST Group (LBG). The winning team of each category proceeds to the next level.

National/Regional Rounds 
National/Regional Rounds (NRRs) are held within one country or a multinational region and are organised by one LBG of that country/region. The teams that won the local rounds compete in the same category, claiming a position in the EBEC Final. Currently, there is a total of 15 National/Regional Rounds with more than 700 students participating.

EBEC Final 
The Final Round of the European BEST Engineering Competition, EBEC Final, is one of the most prominent BEST events, organised by one LBG. Leading students, representing more than 80 of the greatest European universities, are gathered for 10 days to work on multiple tasks in an international environment. During the event, contestants also have the chance to meet people from different cultural backgrounds, to get a taste of the hosting city and also to come in touch with high-profile companies being present at the Job Fair held on the last day of the event.

Categories 

Since the advent of BEST Competitions, different competition categories, such as Debate and Negotiation, were introduced until EBEC developed to its final form, consisting of the Case Study and Team Design categories.

Case Study 
Case Study (CS) is a theoretical, problem-solving challenge that requires the analysis, research, deliberation, testing and presentation of a solution for a current economical, legal or social problem. The solution must be provided within a limited amount of time and be supported by restricted resources, such as time and money.

Team Design 
Team Design (TD) is a practical, hands-on, project-based challenge that requires the design, creation and presentation of a prototype model that can successfully meet specific construction and operation criteria. The model must be created within a limited amount of time and through the use of low-cost and limited resource materials.

Competition Overview 
To date, nine editions have been organised, as summarized below.

EBEC 2009 

EBEC Final was organised for the first time by Local BEST Group Ghent in August 2009. 80 students participated, finding their way to the final between more than 2300 participants in 51 universities in 18 countries. This event was supported by UNEP, that provided a real-life problem for the Team Design part, while EBEC was recognised as partner of the European Year of Creativity and Innovation.

EBEC 2010 
EBEC kept on developing with 71 Technical Universities embracing this venture. With a total of 5000 students participating in 31 countries, 104 finalists were selected and gathered in Cluj-Napoca to prove themselves.

EBEC 2011 
In the 3rd edition of EBEC, 79 technical universities were involved with more than 5000 students participating in the first level of the competition, 104 students having the chance to meet in Istanbul and more than 200 BEST members contributing to the realisation and development of this project.

EBEC 2012 
EBEC Final 2012 was organised in Zagreb, receiving the patronage of the President of Croatia. The event consisted of four working days, Official Opening/Closing Days and one free day, where participants had the opportunity to discover the city of Zagreb.

EBEC 2013 
The 5th edition of EBEC Final took place in Warsaw and involved 83 Technical Universities in Europe, 15 National/Regional EBEC Rounds and more than 6500 students participating. The event was supported by Warsaw University of Technology, as well as important institutions, such as the Ministry of Science and Higher Education and Copernicus Science Centre.

EBEC 2014 
87 Local Rounds, more than 6000 participants, 116 finalists and more than 500 BEST members across 32 countries contributed in the preparation and successful conduction of the 6th edition of EBEC Final in Riga.

EBEC 2015 
In 2015, EBEC Final was held in Porto, reaching the maximum number of participants so far (120) and setting high standards for the upcoming editions.

EBEC 2016 
In 2016, the EBEC Final was held in Belgrad between the 2nd to 9 August.

EBEC 2017 
In 2017, the EBEC Final was held in Brno, during August.

EBEC Challenge 2018 
In 2018 there was not a Final round of EBEC. For this reason it was called EBEC Challenge, as there was a slight difference between the editions.

Reception 
EBEC is a competition that spreads all over Europe reaching thousands of students, universities and companies. But what makes EBEC unique is not only the numbers and the technical outcomes, but the renowned "EBEC spirit", that is the atmosphere surrounding the competition consisting of the teamwork, the unbound creativity being interlinked with knowledge, the strive for the best of oneself. This is what makes students passionate to participate and to work for the best solution, what brings professors and experts to offer their expertise and knowledge for the transparency of the competition, what makes the companies want to support the competition again and ensure that students deal with current technological problems and of course what makes BEST members continuously work more and more passionately to develop the competition. This is what brings all these people together for a common goal, to "Design the Future. Today."

Awards and nominations 
EBEC Final 2015 in Porto was qualified as the best project of Portugal for the next round of European Charlemagne Youth Prize.

Patronages 
BEST always seeks support from institutions that recognise its efforts and share its vision to assist European students. So far, EBEC is supported by many institutions and bodies, such as UNESCO, Young in Action, European Society for Engineering Education (SEFI), Institute of Electrical and Electronics Engineers.

Universities that supported EBEC during recent years include: Aristotle University of Thessaloniki, Czech Technical University in Prague, Graz University of Technology, National Technical University of Athens (NTUA), Silesian University of Technology in Gliwice, Universidade do Porto, Yildiz Teknik Universitesi.

Accreditation 
It is notable that EBEC is starting to be recognised from universities as a project of high quality that contributes to the education of the participants. University of Porto was the first university to recognise the competition by attributing ECTS to the participants.

External links 
 EBEC at best.eu.org
 EBEC on Facebook
 EBEC on Twitter

Engineering competitions
Engineering education
European student organizations
Student competitions